The European Journal on Criminal Policy and Research is a quarterly peer-reviewed academic journal covering criminology as it relates to public policy. It was established in 1993 and is published by Springer Science+Business Media. The editor-in-chief is Ernesto U. Savona (Catholic University of the Sacred Heart).  According to the Journal Citation Reports, the journal has a 2016 impact factor of 1.000.

References

External links

Criminology journals
Quarterly journals
Publications established in 1993
Springer Science+Business Media academic journals
English-language journals